Inka Kancha (Quechua Inka Inca, kancha enclosure; corral, "Inca enclosure" or "Inca corral", Hispanicized spelling Incacancha) is a  mountain in the Andes of Peru. It is situated in the Lima Region, Huarochiri Province, Chicla District. Inka Kancha lies near the Antikuna mountain pass, south of Sillaqaqa.

References

Mountains of Peru
Mountains of Lima Region